Polychidium is a genus of lichenized fungi within the Placynthiaceae family. It is monotypic, containing only the species Polychidium muscicola.

References

Peltigerales
Lichen genera
Taxa named by Erik Acharius
Peltigerales genera